Michael Haydn's Symphony No. 14 in B-flat major, Perger 52, Sherman 14, MH 133, was written in Salzburg between 1768 and 1770 For some reason Lothar Perger believed it to be the last symphony Michael Haydn ever wrote.  This work was at one time attributed to Joseph Haydn, the third work in B-flat major so attributed.

The score is unusual for a number of reasons: the second movement contains an extended concerto-like solo for bassoon, and is subtitled "Concertino per il Fagotto”.  In addition to the normal complement of strings, two oboes and two bassoons, it calls for four 4 horns.  The third movement is, atypically, a minuet and trio, and in the subdominant E-flat major instead of the home key.

It is in three movements:

Allegro molto
Adagio ma non troppo ("Concertino per il Fagotto”),
Menuetto e Trio

N.B. The recording on Olympia OCD 404 claiming to be of this Symphony is in fact that of P.9 Symphony 11.

Notes

References
 A. Delarte, "A Quick Overview Of The Instrumental Music Of Michael Haydn" Bob's Poetry Magazine November 2006: 36–37 (PDF)
 Charles H. Sherman and T. Donley Thomas, Johann Michael Haydn (1737 - 1806), a chronological thematic catalogue of his works. Stuyvesant, New York: Pendragon Press (1993)
 C. Sherman, "Johann Michael Haydn" in The Symphony: Salzburg, Part 2 London: Garland Publishing (1982): lxv

Symphony 14
Compositions in D major
1760s compositions